Liberty Monument is a historic monument located at Ticonderoga in Essex County, New York.  It was built in 1924 and is a bronze sculpture on a tiered granite base.  The lower part of the sculpture is composed of four life-sized figures of a Native American, a Frenchman, a Scottish soldier, and an American.  They symbolize the four groups whose military exploits are part of Ticonderoga's past. The second part is the artist Charles Keck's (1875–1951) interpretation of Liberty.

It was listed on the National Register of Historic Places in 1989.

References

Monuments and memorials on the National Register of Historic Places in New York (state)
Buildings and structures completed in 1924
Buildings and structures in Essex County, New York
Monuments and memorials in New York (state)
1924 sculptures
Bronze sculptures in New York (state)
Statues in New York (state)
National Register of Historic Places in Essex County, New York
Liberty symbols
1924 establishments in New York (state)
Sculptures of men in New York (state)
Sculptures of Native Americans
Sculptures by Charles Keck